Ville Haute is a quarter in central Luxembourg City, in southern Luxembourg. It is the historic center of Luxembourg City and is involved in its UNESCO World Heritage Site status. , Ville Haute has a population of 3,413 inhabitants.

Ville Haute is home to prestigious places, buildings and monuments such as Place Guillaume II, Place d'Armes, Notre-Dame Cathedral and Grand Ducal Palace. The Gëlle Fra Monument of Remembrance war memorial is situated in Constitution Square.

References

Quarters of Luxembourg City